Everything or Nothing may refer to:

 James Bond 007: Everything or Nothing, a third-person shooter video game
 Everything or Nothing, the first album (2008) of Canadian singer-songwriter Lisa Lavie
 "Everything or Nothing" (song), a 2004 song by Mýa
 Everything or Nothing (2012 film) a documentary about the James Bond films